Elizabeth Mary Rata (born 1952) is a New Zealand academic who is a sociologist of education and a professor in the School of Critical Studies in Education at the University of Auckland. Her views and research on Māori education and the place of indigenous knowledge in the New Zealand education system have received criticism from other academics.

Academic career
Rata gained both her MEd and PhD from the University of Auckland.  Her Master's thesis, Maori survival and structural separateness: the history of Te Runanga o nga Kura Kaupapa Maori o Tamaki Makaurau 1987–1989, and her doctoral thesis, Global capitalism and the revival of ethnic traditionalism in New Zealand: the emergence of tribal-capitalism, relate to biculturalism in New Zealand. After a Senior Fulbright Scholar to Georgetown University, Washington, DC in 2003, she returned to Auckland, becoming a professor in 2017. Rata is the director of the Knowledge in Education Research Unit (KERU) at the University of Auckland, which she established in 2010.

In 2013 Rata published an opinion piece on the New Zealand school secondary curriculum decrying the lack of explicit knowledge and a "focus on skills and the process of learning." The piece was directly criticised by authors such as Steve Maharey and Jane Gilbert. 
	
Rata was one of the principal figures in developing the kura kaupapa schooling project. She was the secretary of the combined kōhanga reo whānau seeking to develop continuation for Māori language learners graduating from kōhanga reo and was a member of the original Kura Kaupapa Māori Working Party. However, according to Rebecca Wirihana, herself an early Kura activist, "Elizabeth has been wiped out of the history of kura kaupapa." Her recent criticisms of the direction of Māori immersion education, and of the insertion of mātauranga Māori into New Zealand education, have prompted some highly critical responses.

Rata was the winner of the British Educational Research Association (BERA) Paper of the Year in 2012 for her article about knowledge in education. In that year her book The Politics of Knowledge in Education was published by Routledge. The work signalled the shift in focus from her earlier research about ethnic politics to include knowledge in education. Rata's research about knowledge in education, specifically the school curriculum is best known for her development of the Curriculum Design Coherence Model (CDC Model). A 2021 research paper published in Review of Education provides a detailed account of the use of the CDC Model in the international Knowledge-Rich School Project.

In July 2021, in the context of a review of the NCEA (New Zealand's National Curriculum), Rata, along with six other University of Auckland professors and emeritus professors published a controversial letter entitled "In Defence of Science" in the New Zealand Listener, which said indigenous knowledge (or mātauranga Māori) "falls far short of what can be defined as science itself".

Selected works 
Rata, Elizabeth. A political economy of neotribal capitalism. Lexington Books, 2000.
Rata, Elizabeth. "Late capitalism and ethnic revivalism: A New Middle Age'?." Anthropological Theory 3, no. 1 (2003): 43–63.
Rata, Elizabeth. "Rethinking biculturalism." Anthropological Theory 5, no. 3 (2005): 267–284.
Li, Tania Murray, Baviskar Amita, Rob Cramb, Kaushik Ghosh, Rusaslina Idrus, Pauline E. Peters, Nancy Postero, Elizabeth Rata, and Irina Wenk. "Indigeneity, capitalism, and the management of dispossession." Current Anthropology 51, no. 3 (2010): 385–414.
Rata, Elizabeth. "The politics of knowledge in education." British Educational Research Journal 38, no. 1 (2012): 103–124.
Rata, Elizabeth. Knowledge and Teaching, British Educational Research Journal. 43(5), 1003–1017. 2017
Rata, E. Ethnic Revival. In Fathali M. Moghaddam Ed. The SAGE Encyclopedia of Political Behavior, (pp. 265–268). Thousand Oaks, CA: Sage Publications. 2017.
Rata, Elizabeth. Knowledge-Rich Teaching: A Model of Curriculum Design Coherence, British Educational Research Journal. 45: (2019) 681–697. 
Rata, Elizabeth. "The Curriculum Design Coherence Model in the Knowledge-Rich School Project". Review of Education 9, no. 2 (1 June 2021): 448–95.

References

External links
 

1952 births
Living people
New Zealand women academics
Sociologists of education
University of Auckland alumni
Academic staff of the University of Auckland